Maddenia is an extinct genus of astrapothere, meridiungulate herbivore mammals characterised by its large tusks and the development of proboscis, endemic of South America. This genus was discovered in an outcrop near to the Lake Colhué Huapi in the place La Cantera, in the Chubut Province, in Argentina, in sediments corresponding to the Sarmiento Formation, that dates of the Late Oligocene (Deseadan South American land mammal age).

Etymology 
The name of the genus Maddenia, is in homage to the palaeontologist Richard Madden, by his contributions to the palaeontology of South America, whereas the name of the type species and only known, Maddenia lapidaria, derives of the Latin lapidarius, "of stone".

Description 
This species is based in the holotype MPEF PV 7735, a fragment of jawbone with molar and premolar teeth associated and a partial canine associated, in addition to several additional specimens that include isolated teeth and other fragments of jaws. From these remains it was established that Maddenia was a small astrapothere, near of 50% smaller than Astraponotus. Its molar were high, with complex crowns and with canines moderately developed, characteristics of the advanced astrapotheres of big size of the Oligocene and the Miocene (like Astrapotherium and Granastrapotherium), which suggests that it must to occupy a habitat differentiated regarding other forms of big size, and that by its anatomical characteristics constitutes an intermediate form between the primitive forms like Albertogaudrya and the astrapotherids like Parastrapotherium, with which conform sister taxa to the two subfamilies of the family Astrapotheriidae, Astrapotheriinae and Uruguaytheriinae.

Phylogeny 
Cladogram according to Bond et al., 2011, standing out the phylogenetic position of Maddenia:

References 

Meridiungulata
Oligocene mammals of South America
Deseadan
Paleogene Argentina
Fossils of Argentina
Fossil taxa described in 2009
Prehistoric placental genera
Golfo San Jorge Basin
Sarmiento Formation